Josef Aloys Frölich or Alois von Frölich (10 March 1766, Marktoberdorf – 11 March 1841) was a German doctor, botanist and entomologist. He is not to be confused with Franz Anton Gottfried Frölich (1805–1878), his son, also an entomologist but specialising in Lepidoptera.

In the field of botany he described many species within the genus Hieracium. The genus Froelichia (family Amaranthaceae) is named in his honor.

Works
 De Gentiana libellus sistens specierum cognitarum descriptiones cum observationibus. Accedit tabula aenea Erlangen: Walther, 1796 [Titel auch: De Gentiana, Erlangen: Kunstmann; De gentiana dissertatio; Dissertatio inauguralis de Gentiana], zugleich: Erlangen, Med. Diss., January 1796
 Beschreibungen einiger neuer Eingeweidewürmer, in: Der Naturforscher, 24, S. 101-162, Halle, 1789
 Bemerkungen über einige seltene Käfer aus der Insektensammlung des Herrn Hofr. und Prof. Rudolph in Erlangen, in: Der Naturforscher, 26, S. 68-165, Halle, 1792.

See also
 :Category:Taxa named by Josef Aloys Frölich

References
 H. Wolf: Josef Aloys Frölich (1766-1841) und die Flora von Ostwürttemberg, in: Restaurierung und Katalogisierung des Herbariums Leiner in Konstanz (Berichte der Botanischen Arbeitsgemeinschaft Südwestdeutschland, Beiheft 1), S. 81-148, Karlsruhe, 2004. ISSN 1617-5506
 W. Lippert: Josef Aloys Frölich und die Flora des Allgäus, in: Restaurierung und Katalogisierung des Herbariums Leiner in Konstanz (Berichte der Botanischen Arbeitsgemeinschaft Südwestdeutschland, Beiheft 1), S. 149-159, Karlsruhe, 2004. ISSN 1617-5506
 Karl Otto Müller: Alois Frölich: Arzt und Naturforscher 1766 - 1841, in: Schwäbische Lebensbilder, Bd. 1, S. 203-207, Stuttgart: Kohlhammer, 1940
 Neue Deutsche Biographie, Bd. 4, S. 360 und Bd. 5, S. 77
 German page well illustrated

External links 
 Einträge im International Plant Name Index für Alois Frölich
German language page Well illustrated.

German entomologists
1766 births
1841 deaths
19th-century German botanists
People from Ostallgäu
18th-century German botanists